Ativin is a post-rock band from Bloomington, Indiana. Chris Carothers and Dan Burton of Early Day Miners make up their core, with a revolving door of drummers.

Biography 
Formed in Bloomington, Indiana in the winter of 1994 after Chris Carothers (guitar) and Rory Leitch (drums) met at Indiana University. Guitarist Dan Burton joined the group the following spring, cementing the band's loud, instrumental rock sound. Steve Albini and Carl Saff recorded the band's debut EP, Pills vs. Planes, which was released in December 1996. The spring of 1997 saw the release of the Modern Gang Reader/Larkin single, the first of several releases for Secretly Canadian Records. The band worked with Andy Bryant at King Size on German Water, its debut album for Secretly Canadian, releasing it in March 1998. A return to Albini's Chicago studio, Electrical Audio, yielded the four-song EP Summing The Approach, which was released in the fall of 1998. Taking a break while Carothers moved out west and Burton worked on Early Day Miners, Ativin reconvened in 2001 with drummer Kevin Duneman, to record Interiors, which added sparse, minimalist vocals to their sound. Interiors was released in early 2002 to critical acclaim. Continuing on in the same vein, Ativin recorded Night Mute in both Chicago (at Electrical Audio with Greg Norman) and Portland,OR using drummers Mark Rice (John Wilkes Booze) and Joey Ficken (The Swords Project) for release in early 2004.

Discography 
 Pills Versus Planes (1996)
 Modern Gang Reader/ Larkin - 7" (Secretly Canadian, 1997)
 German Water (Secretly Canadian, 1999)
 Summing the Approach (Secretly Canadian, 1999)
 Interiors (Secretly Canadian, 2002)
 Night Mute (Secretly Canadian, 2004)

See also 
Early Day Miners

External links
 Archive of Official Site
 Early Day Miners
Last.fm

Rock music groups from Indiana
American post-rock groups
Polyvinyl Record Co. artists
Secretly Canadian artists